The Polish railways network consists of around  of track as of 2019, of which  is electrified. National electrification system is 3 kV DC.

Poland is a member of the International Union of Railways (UIC), its UIC Country Code is 51.

Rail services are operated by a range of public and private rail operators. The nationally owned PKP Group operates the majority of rail services. In addition to PKP owned companies, there are a number of private cargo operators, as well as a number of independent passenger operators, owned predominantly by Voivodeship provincial governments.

Overview 

The vast majority of the network was built before World War II by various railway companies, including by the German Deutsche Reichsbahn and by the Russian Imperial State Railways, and a minor component was built from 1946 onwards by the Communist authorities of the Polish People's Republic. During the invasion of Poland at the beginning of World War II the Polish railway network was crippled by the Luftwaffe bombing campaign. Due to the average age of the network and lack of maintenance, many sections are limited to speeds below  even on trunk lines.  allow  or more.

Since Poland's entry into the European Union in 2004, major financing has been made available by European financing institutions to improve both the Polish rail network and the rolling stock fleet. Up to June 2014, the European Investment Bank had provided loans totalling €1.9 billion for rail modernization projects in Poland. An additional €578 million had been provided through December 2013 to modernize 70 percent of PKP Intercity rolling stock. The €665 million purchase of twenty Alstom Pendolino high-speed trains delivered in 2014 was financed in part by €342 million from the European Investment Bank.

Poland currently has no high-speed lines operated at speeds above . The Central Rail Line, centralna magistrala kolejowa, 'CMK', which links Warsaw to Katowice and Kraków, was designed with an alignment to permit , but for over 30 years after its construction Poland possessed no rolling stock capable of speeds above . Since 2008 the CMK has been upgraded to allow higher speeds, including installation of European Train Control System Level 1 which provides the Cab signalling required by high speed trains.

In December 2014 new Alstom Pendolino high-speed trains were put into service between Gdańsk, Warsaw and Kraków reducing the rail travel time from Gdańsk to Warsaw to 2 hours 58 minutes, to be reduced in late 2015 to 2 hours 37 minutes.

In 2008, the government announced the construction of a dedicated high speed line based on the French TGV model and possibly using TGV style trainsets, by 2020. In December 2011 plans to build the high speed 'Y' line were postponed until 2030, due to the high cost.

As of 2008, foreign services include EuroCity and EuroNight trains between Western and Eastern Europe, most notably the EN Jan Kiepura direct sleeping cars between Russia and Amsterdam, Basel and Munich via Warsaw, Poznan and Germany. They generally consist of coaches from different rail operators that are added to the train as it passes through their area of operation.

Links with adjacent countries 
Voltage of electrification systems may differ. The Polish voltage is 3 kV DC.
 Same gauge – :
 Czech Republic – same voltage
 Germany – 3 kV DC/15 kV AC
 Slovakia – same voltage
 Sweden – by train ferry; proposed fixed links, one from Szczecin to Ystad via Bornholm Island, the other from Gdynia to Karlskrona, both with 15 kV AC and SE-C loading gauge (Voltage change 3 kV DC/15 kV AC on Polish side)
 Break of gauge – /
 Belarus – 3 kV DC/25 kV AC, a short stretch of dual-gauge track terminates at Grodno
 Lithuania – 3 kV DC/25 kV AC, as part of the construction of Rail Baltica a new standard-gauge diesel line from there to Kaunas was built in October 2015
 Russia (Kaliningrad Oblast) – not electrified – there are short stretches of dual gauge sections around border area
 Ukraine – 3 kV DC/25 kV AC

Broad-gauge railways 

The network is standard gauge except for the Linia Hutnicza Szerokotorowa (literally meaning "Broad Gauge Metallurgy Line", but typically known by its abbreviation LHS) and a few short stretches near border crossings. The LHS to Sławków is the longest broad-gauge line, single track, almost 400 km long, from the Ukrainian border just east of Hrubieszów. It is the westernmost broad gauge line connected to the system of the former Soviet Union.

Since the 2022 Russian invasion of Ukraine, there are proposed to build more broad-gauge lines in and around Poland. Linia Hutnicza Szerokotorowa westward extension from Slawkow via Gliwice, Gorlitz, Jena, Paderborn and Oberhausen to Amsterdam and Rotterdam, and branch to Hamburg, and new broad-gauge link from Ukrainian border via Chelm, Lublin, Bialystok and Suwalki to Mockai (Lithuania) and branch to Gdansk Port.

Narrow gauge railways

Operators

PKP Group
Polskie Koleje Państwowe (PKP), a state-owned corporate group and part of the PKP Group conglomerate, is the main provider of railway services, holding an almost complete monopoly on long-distance passenger services. It is both supported and partly funded by the government.

There are three main PKP companies:
 PKP PLK – owns and maintains infrastructure including lines and stations.
 PKP Intercity – provides long-distance connections on the most popular routes. Trains are divided into the categories: EuroNight (EN), EuroCity (EC), Express InterCity (EIC), Express InterCity Premium (EIP) – generally faster and more expensive, InterCity (IC) and (TLK) (interregional fast trains, slower than EN/EC/EIC but cheaper) and international fast trains.
 PKP Cargo – provides cargo rail transport.

Non-PKP operators

While PKP is the largest rail operator in Poland, there are several independent operators of passenger and cargo railway services. Independent Cargo operators are predominantly privately owned. Passenger operators are predominantly owned by Voivodeship governments. These include:

 Polregio (formerly Przewozy Regionalne) – owned by regional authorities of the 16 voivodeships, formerly part of PKP Group. Operates local passenger trains (under the REGIO brand) financed by local governments, low-cost long-distance trains (interREGIO) and short-distance international trains jointly with DB Regio (REGIOekspres). Passenger trains are rather slow, mostly electric multiple units and diesel railcars/railbuses. InterREGIO trains are of slightly lower standard than TLK trains (no first class and dining cars), but are usually a bit cheaper. In June 2016, Lithuanian Railways and Przewozy Regionalne started weekend passenger train service between Bialystok and Kaunas in Lithuania.
 Deutsche Bahn
 DB Regio connects from the border stations at Gorzów, Kostrzyn, Szczecin with the DB network with local trains (the Polish parts of their routes are generally operated by Przewozy Regionalne).
 Arriva RP (a wholly owned subsidiary of Deutsche Bahn) is a regional operator on lines in the Kuyavian-Pomeranian and Pomeranian regions
 Koleje Dolnośląskie – a regional operator on a few lines in Lower Silesia.
 Koleje Małopolskie – a regional operator in the region of Krakow.
 Koleje Mazowieckie – a regional operator on all lines in Masovian Voivodeship, including Warsaw.
 Koleje Śląskie – a regional operator in the Silesian Voivodeship 
 Koleje Wielkopolskie – a regional operator on a few lines in Greater Poland Voivodeship.
 Łódzka Kolej Aglomeracyjna – a commuter railway operator in the Łódź Voivodeship.

Rapid transit

 PKP Szybka Kolej Miejska in the Tri-city area, part of the PKP Group
 Warszawska Kolej Dojazdowa, a suburban railway in Warsaw and Western suburbs
 Szybka Kolej Miejska, a suburban city-owned network in Warsaw
 Warsaw Metro, an underground metro system in Warsaw, currently undergoing a period of expansion.

Freight operators 
Freight services are provided by a number of private and public rail operators. These include:
 DB Cargo Polska
 Freightliner
 PKP Cargo 
 PKP LHS 
 Lotos Kolej 
 Orlen KolTrans 
 CTL Logistics

Rail links to adjacent countries
 (Belarus) – yes  break-of-gauge /
 (Lithuania) – yes  break-of-gauge /
 (Russia(Kaliningrad)) – yes  break-of-gauge /
 (Ukraine) – yes  break-of-gauge / apart from LHS

See also 

 High-speed rail in Poland
 History of rail transport in Poland
 List of Railway lines of Poland
 Polish State Railways
 Railroad Guards (Poland)
 Transport in Poland

References

External links 
 
 Passenger Portal – connections search, delays and disruptions
 National railway timetable
 Polish Rail TV